Heeswijk may refer to:

 Heeswijk, a town in North Brabant, the Netherlands
 Heeswijk (Cuijk), a hamlet in North Brabant, the Netherlands
 Heeswijk (Utrecht), a hamlet in the Netherlands

See also
 van Heeswijk